Talukdar Mohammad Towhid Jung (born 23 August 1971), also known by his daak naam Murad, is a Bangladesh Awami League politician and former member of parliament from Dhaka-19. He was a member of the Standing Committee of the Ministry of Youth and Sports (Bangladesh).

Early life
Talukdar Mohammad Towhid Jung Murad was born on 23 August 1971 in Dhaka. His father, Mohammad Anwar Jung Talukdar, belonged to the Bengali Muslim Jung family which descended from a line of hereditary aristocratic Taluqdars. His mother, Syeda Lutfun Nahar, belonged to a Bengali Muslim family of Syeds, claiming ancestry back to the Islamic prophet Muhammad.

Career
Murad Jung was elected to Parliament in 2008 from Dhaka-19 as a Bangladesh Awami League candidate acquiring 2,88,412 votes.

References

Awami League politicians
Living people
9th Jatiya Sangsad members
1971 births
20th-century Bengalis
Bangladeshi people of Arab descent